Pocinovice is a municipality and village in Domažlice District in the Plzeň Region of the Czech Republic. It has about 600 inhabitants.

Administrative parts
The village of Orlovice is an administrative part of Pocinovice.

References

Villages in Domažlice District
Chodové